The Museum of Art of Puerto Rico (Spanish: Museo de Arte de Puerto Rico, abbreviated MAPR) is an art museum in Santurce, a barrio of San Juan, Puerto Rico, with 18 exhibition halls. The museum is located in a historic building, formerly occupied by the San Juan Municipal Hospital.

History 
The museum building, designed by architect William H. Shimmelphening and built in 1920, is the remaining building in the former ruined complex of the San Juan Municipal Hospital. The building served as a hospital until 1966 when most of its body was moved to the newly inaugurated Centro Médico de Río Piedras (Río Piedras Medical Center). Afterwards it served as office space for the Puerto Rico Department of Transportation and Public Works until 1975.

The idea behind the Puerto Rico Museum of Art dates to 1995, when the Puerto Rico Tourism Company (Spanish: Compañía de Turismo de Puerto Rico) with funding by the Government Development Bank for Puerto Rico (Banco Gubernamental de Fomento, BGF). Instead of demolishing the building, the old structure was incorporated into the new museum building.

Gallery

See also

Graphopoli

References

External links
Museum of Art of Puerto Rico within Google Arts & Culture

Art museums and galleries in Puerto Rico
Museums in San Juan, Puerto Rico
Puerto Rico
Museum of Art of Puerto Rico